Jean-Marc Brûlé (born 16 June 1965 in Caen) is a French politician of Europe Écologie–The Greens, Regional Councillor of Ile-de-France. Founder of the Asian Committee of The Greens, he is chairman of L'Atelier, a regional resource center of the social economy and was a national secretary-assistant of Europe Écologie in charge of elections and institutions.

References

External links 

 Web site of Jean-Marc Brûlé

1965 births
Living people
Convention for a Progressive Alternative politicians
Europe Ecology – The Greens politicians
Politicians from Caen
Tibet freedom activists
Mayors of places in Île-de-France